"Mike Quin" (1906–1947) was the CPUSA pen name of an American writer, born Paul William Ryan, who also used the second pen name "Robert Finnegan," best known for his posthumous book The Big Strike (1949) about the 1934 West Coast waterfront strike.

Background

Mike Quin was born Paul William Ryan in 1906 in San Francisco, California, shortly after the 1906 San Francisco earthquake ( April 18).  His father was an Irish-American traveling salesman who left the family; his mother was an Irish-Jewish-French dressmaker.  He left high school at age 15.

Career

Quin took various jobs until age 19, when he became a seaman and first got involved in maritime unions.  Shortly before the Great Depression began, he took a job in Los Angeles bookstore, which writers frequented.  One of these writers was a Marxist and radicalized Quin, who joined the John Reed Club chapter in Hollywood.

Interested in writing all along, Quin finally had a short story published in Scribner's Magazine.  Through the John Reed Club, he began publishing in the club's Partisan magazine as well as the New Masses and the Western Worker (predecessor of People's World).  During the 1934 strikes, he continued to write for such publications (including the Dispatcher of the International Longshore and Warehouse Union or ILWU).  In 1936-1937, also worked the for the WPA's Writers Project.  In 1938, he helped found the Daily People's World (later People's World), where he served as executive editor and worked for the rest of his life.  His 1940 pamphlet The Yanks Are Not Coming! received national notice, and Walter Winchell called him one of the most dangerous people in America.  His first collected works Dangerous Thoughts (1940) received a congratulatory letter from Theodore Dreiser, who wrote an introduction to Dangerous Thoughts the following year.  Also in 1941, People's World published his collected serial "The Enemy Within."  In 1943, the CIO hired him to the scriptwriters for a radio show entitled Facts to Fight Fascism.  From 1943 to 1945, the CIO made him "CIO Reporter on the Air":  one of his last assignments was to cover the United Nations Conference on International Organization, which ran April 25 to June 26, 1945, in San Francisco.  With the end of WWII, his career at the CIO ended, and he became a mystery novel writer under the pen name of "Robert Finnegan."

Ryan wrote under the name, Mike Quin, for his newspaper writing and his early novels.  Later in his career he wrote pulp fiction under another pseudonym, "Robert Finnegan."

He worked several different jobs.  He was a sailor, a Hollywood bookstore worker, a writer for the (ILWU) and the WPA Writers' Project, Director of Public Relations, Congress of Industrial Organizations (CIO), "CIO Reporter on the Air", Daily People's World columnist and editor, National Maritime Union broadcast producer.  (The People's World was the Communist Party of America's west coast daily newspaper.)

He was active in the Communist Party. Many of his books were published by the party's publishing house, International Publishers.  He was a founding member of "The Yanks are Not Coming" committee to keep the United States out of World War II following the Molotov–Ribbentrop Pact.

Personal life and death
Quin married Rose and then Mary King O'Donnell; he had at least one child.

After several years of undiagnosed illness, Quin received a diagnosis around April 1947 that he had advanced cancer with only two months to live just as he was moving his family to Olema, California.

Mike Quin died on August 14, 1947, and was buried in San Francisco, California.

Works
Quin wrote The Yanks Are Not Coming originally as a pamphlet for the 1940 CIO annual conference in San Francisco.  Quin's posthumous book The Big Strike was a journalistic work based on the 1934 West Coast waterfront strike.

Contributions to the New Masses
 "Modern Heroes:  William Green and Matthew Woll" Poem (1936)
 "Did You Ever See a Dream Fighting?" (1941)
 "A Letter About Sam Darcy" (1941)
 "Investigation:  A Poem"

Contributions to People's World
 "Seeing Red" with song satirizing Henry Ford to the tune of "Yankee Doodle" (1938)
 "Seeing Red" with workers correspondence (1938)
 "Seeing Red" on economic slump (1938)
 "Seeing Red" on United Office and Professional Workers of America CIO (1938)
 "Seeing Red" on anti-communist journalism (1938)
 "Seeing Red" on International Longshore and Warehouse Union as example of trade union unity (1938)
 "Seeing Red" on agriculture in China and the USA (1938)
 "Seeing Red" on Jim Crow (1938)
 "Seeing Red" on Jim Crow (1938)
 "Seeing Red" on mimeograph publications (1938)
 "Seeing Red" on the WPA's Federal Arts Committee and art for labor (1938)
 "Seeing Red" on free speech for labor unions on radio (1938)
 "Double Check" on benefits of unionizing (1938)
 "Double Check" on Maxwell Anderson's play Valley Forge (1938)
 "Double Check" on benefits of Big Business (1938)
 "Double Check" on American journeying to fight in the Lincoln Battalion during the Spanish Civil War (1938)
 "Double Check" on American now fighting in the Lincoln Battalion during the Spanish Civil War (1938)

Books by "Mike Quin
 The C.S. Case Against Labor: The Story of the Sacramento Criminal Syndicalism Railroading (1935)
 Ashcan the M-Plan:  The Yanks Are NOT Coming (1940)
 Dangerous Thoughts (1940)
 The Enemy Within (1941)
 More Dangerous Thoughts (1941)
On the Drumhead: A Selection from the Writing of Mike Quin; A Memorial Volume (1948)
The Big Strike (1949)

 Books as "Robert Finnegan"
 The Lying Ladies (1946)
 The Bandaged Nude (1947)
 Many a Monster (1948)

Books as Paul Ryan
 The Sacred Thing (1933)
 Business Before Bullets (1947)

References

External sources
 The Big Strike (PDF)

1906 births
1947 deaths
20th-century American novelists
American male novelists
Members of the Communist Party USA
Writers from San Francisco
Pulp fiction writers
20th-century American male writers